Uda Walawwe Mahim Bandaralage Chanaka Asanka Welegedara, commonly as Chanaka Welegedara, (born 20 March 1981), is a former Sri Lankan international cricketer who played all formats of the game.

Early career
An alumnus of St. Thomas' College, Matale and Maliyadeva College, Kurunegala, he proved the future prospects of entering national side with his bowling performances in school level. A left-arm fast bowler by trade, he has a healthy bowling average in both first-class and List A cricket, in the mid-to-low 20s. He has made appearances for Moors Sports Club and North Central Province's cricket club, and was called up for the Sri Lanka A squad for the match against Bangladesh during Sri Lanka's 2007 tour.

Legacy
On 6 April 2015, Welagedera recorded the best economical spell of Twenty20 cricket history against Sinhalese Sports Club. His spell finished with 4 overs, 2 maidens, four wickets for just two runs (4-2-2-4), breaking the 4-3-2-2 spell of South African Chris Morris. The record was later broken by Pakistani pacer Mohammad Irfan with the figures of 4-3-1-2.

Early career
An alumnus of St. Thomas' College, Matale, he proved the future prospects of entering national side with his bowling performances in school level. A left-arm fast bowler by trade, he has a healthy bowling average in both first-class and List A cricket, in the mid-to-low 20s. He has made appearances for Moors Sports Club and North Central Province's cricket club, and was called up for the Sri Lanka A squad for the match against Bangladesh during Sri Lanka's 2007 tour. He made his Twenty20 debut on 17 August 2004, for Moors Sports Club in the 2004 SLC Twenty20 Tournament.

Legacy
On 6 April 2015, Welagedera recorded the best economical spell of Twenty20 cricket history against Sinhalese Sports Club. His spell finished with 4 overs, 2 maidens, four wickets for just two runs (4-2-2-4), breaking the 4-3-2-2 spell of South African Chris Morris. The record was later broken by Pakistani pacer Mohammad Irfan with 4-3-1-2 figures.

International career
On 18 December 2007, he made his Test match debut in the third test against England at Galle. Welagedara was selected in Sri Lanka's test squad for their 2008 tour of the West Indies, but had to wait until November 2009 for his second Test appearance, which came against India, and he would go on to play all three Tests in the series. His first Test wicket was England's Paul Collingwood.

He was included in Sri Lanka's One Day International squad to play against India in December 2009, making his debut on 15 December in Rajkot, and in a match where 825 runs were scored in 100 overs, he returned figures of 2/63 from his ten overs, claiming the wickets of Virender Sehwag and Virat Kohli. He also claimed a five wicket haul against India.

He was the first Test cricketer to boast six initials to his name. He played as constant player in the Sri Lankan Playing XI for 6 years after Lasith Malinga's resignation from the longer format.

Post Test Cricket 
Welegedara moved to Australia in 2015 and started playing for a local Victorian Cricket team Westmeadows, for the 2015/16 Australian Cricket season. In his first season, he finished with figures of 146 overs, 27 maidens, 34 wickets, at an average of 13.38. Moving into the next season he has been made coach of Westmeadows.

See also
List of St. Thomas' College, Matale alumni

References

External links

1981 births
Living people
Sri Lankan cricketers
Sri Lanka Test cricketers
Sri Lanka One Day International cricketers
Chandimal, Dinesh
Moors Sports Club cricketers
Wayamba cricketers
North Central Province cricketers
Tamil Union Cricket and Athletic Club cricketers
Ruhuna cricketers
Kandurata Warriors cricketers